Terrace Bay Airport  is an abandoned airport that was located  north of Terrace Bay, Ontario, Canada.

Terrace Bay Council voted in 2005 to close the airport's runway, saving the community roughly $40,000 a year. Ministry of Natural Resources, Hydro and emergency helicopters will still have access to the facility year round.

References

External links
Terrace Bay Airport on COPA's Places to Fly airport directory

Defunct airports in Ontario